Woman Worldwide is a remix album by French electronic music duo Justice, released on 24 August 2018 by Ed Banger Records and Because Music. Self-described as "10 years of Justice mixed and remixed", the album features reworked tracks from their discography. The album was recorded similar to the duo's live performances.

Background and release
Justice began working on the stage production and tracklist for Woman Worldwide in June 2016. The album incorporates material from their discography. The duo wrote down every track they released at the time and broke down every song by tempo, key, and how much they wanted to incorporate each song into their live set. As the live set was still being finalized, the band rehearsed the live set for months. The band stated they rehearsed their material from two to five hours every day.

The album was announced on 10 May 2018 after their performance at the 2018 Google I/O conference in Mountain View, California. A music video for "Stop" was also uploaded to Justice's YouTube account, with the Woman Worldwide edit of "Stop" released as the album's lead single on 7 May 2018. "D.A.N.C.E." x "Fire" x "Safe and Sound" was released as the album's second single on 22 June 2018. The third single, "Randy" (WWW), was released on 6 July 2018. "Chorus (WWW)", the album's fourth and final single, was released on 16 August 2018. The album was released on 24 August 2018, and charted in the UK and US dance charts, at positions 6 and 22 respectively. It also charted at number 10 in France, as well as other European countries.

Critical reception

The album has received generally favorable reviews from critics. At Metacritic, which assigns a normalized rating out of 100 to reviews from mainstream publications, the album received an average score of 69, based on 9 reviews.

The album received a Grammy Award for Best Dance/Electronic Album at the 61st Annual Grammy Awards.

Track listing

Personnel
Adapted from liner notes.

 Gaspard Augé – writing, production
 Xavier de Rosnay – writing, production
 Thomas Jumin – artwork

Accolades

Charts

Release history

References

2018 albums
Ed Banger Records albums
Justice (band) albums
Grammy Award for Best Dance/Electronica Album